Melina Debora Sirolli (born 23 April 1984) was an Argentine artistic gymnast, representing her nation at international competitions. 

At the 1998 South American Games, she won two gold medals, one silver, and two bronze. At the 1999 Pan American Games, she won a bronze medal in the balance beam event.

Sirolli also participated at the 2000 Summer Olympics, the 2003 World Artistic Gymnastics Championships, and the 2003 Pan American Games.

At the 2008 Pan American Trampoline and Tumbling Championships, she won a silver medal in the tumbling team event.

References

External links

1984 births
Living people
Place of birth missing (living people)
Argentine female artistic gymnasts
Argentine female trampolinists
Olympic gymnasts of Argentina
Gymnasts at the 2000 Summer Olympics
Pan American Games medalists in gymnastics
Pan American Games bronze medalists for Argentina
Gymnasts at the 1999 Pan American Games
Gymnasts at the 2003 Pan American Games
South American Games medalists in gymnastics
South American Games gold medalists for Argentina
South American Games silver medalists for Argentina
South American Games bronze medalists for Argentina
Competitors at the 1998 South American Games
Medalists at the 1999 Pan American Games
21st-century Argentine women